Garzón Point is a point between Oscar Cove and Skontorp Cove in southern Paradise Harbor, on the Danco Coast of Graham Land, Antarctica. Following Argentine exploration in the area it was named in 1956 by the Comision de Coordinacion Geografica (Argentina) after General Eugenio Garzón, a hero of the Argentine War of Independence.

References

Headlands of Graham Land
Danco Coast